Nils Christensen or Kristensen may refer to:

 Nils Christensen (aviator) (1921–2017), Norwegian-Canadian aviator
 Nils Christensen Ringnæs (1792–1863), Norwegian politician
 Nils Reinhardt Christensen (1919–1990), Norwegian film director and screenwriter
 Nils Christiansen (1913–1988), Filipino swimmer
 Niels Christiansen (born 1966), Danish businessman, CEO of Lego
 Niels Christensen (1865–1952), Danish-American inventor
 Niels Christian Christensen, (1881–1945), Danish sport shooter
 Niels Kristensen (born 1988), Danish footballer midfielder
 Niels Kristensen (rower) (born 1920), Danish rower